= Houseman (restaurant) =

Restaurant in New York City, U.S.

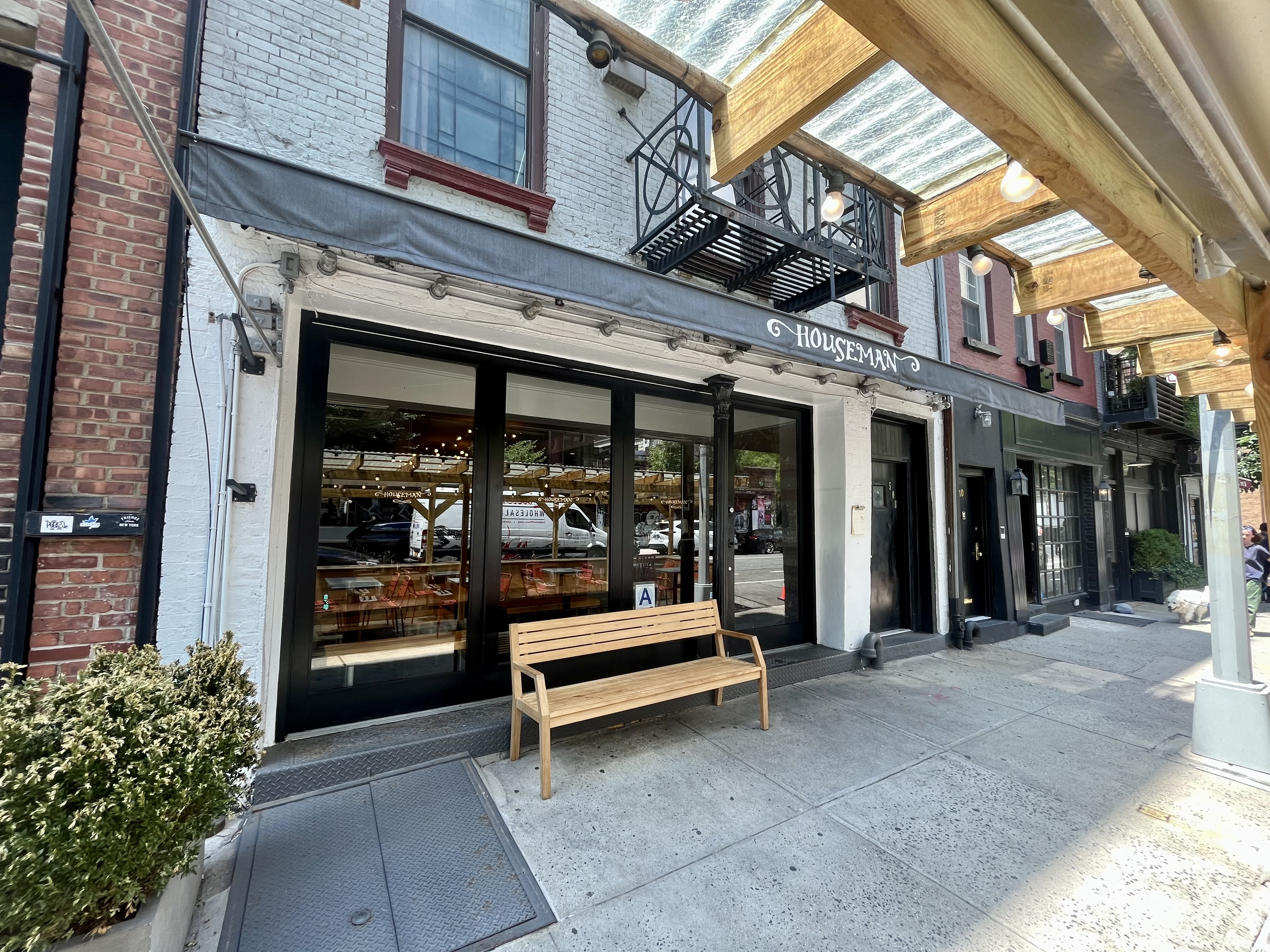
- The restaurant's exterior in 2024
- Interactive map of Houseman

Restaurant information
- Established: June 2015
- Location: 508 Greenwich Street, New York City, New York, 10018, United States
- Coordinates: 40°43′33″N 74°00′33″W
- Website: housemanrestaurant.com

Houseman is a restaurant in New York City.
